Celesta Geyer (née Herrmann; July 18, 1901February 19, 1982) was an American woman most famous for being the circus fat lady known as Dolly Dimples (also Bonnie Sonora and Jolly Dolly Geyer). She was born in Cincinnati, Ohio.

Early years 
Celesta Herrmann was born July 18, 1901, in Cincinnati, Ohio.

She grew up in a close-knit German-American family. Six times a day, the family sat down for large meals and substantial snacks. The young Celesta had developed a big appetite by the time she was six and preferred playing with candy rather than toys. Her parents' way of soothing Dolly's hurt feelings over the teasing of her classmates was to provide her with more home-cooked food.  By the time she left school (she dropped out to escape the teasing of her classmates and to help contribute financially to her family) she weighed nearly 300 pounds.  By her twenties she weighed nearly 400 pounds.

Her biography details the many painful incidents she endured growing up, while also recalling the insulated world provided to her by her loving family.  Despite the emphasis on food in the family, Celesta seems to be the only one who developed a serious weight problem.  Despite, or perhaps because of, her girth, Celesta was a strikingly attractive woman and she had several suitors.  Celesta worked in factories, sold cosmetics and worked as a manicurist before marrying Frank Geyer, a man of normal weight. By all accounts, Frank and Celesta had a happy marriage for over 40 years, but no children resulted.  In the late 1920s her husband lost his job at Ford Motor Company.  As the Depression reduced his job prospects even further, financial need resulted in Celesta and Frank joining a travelling circus at the invitation of a professional fat lady who told Celesta that people were laughing at her anyway, so she should make them pay good money for the privilege. Celesta took the stage name "Dolly Dimples".

Circus career 
Dolly Dimples was billed as "The World's Most Beautiful Fat Lady". Also an accomplished singer and impersonator of celebrities of the day, such as Kate Smith, Dolly's act became a big draw on the sideshow circuit. Her husband also worked with the sideshow as a road assistant and acted as Dolly's manager. By the late 1930s they were working for the Ringling Brothers, the pinnacle of the traveling circuses. By this time, Dolly was consuming approximately  daily, enough for five average women.

Her daily diet typically consisted of five pounds of meat, several pounds of potatoes, four loaves of bread, a gallon of milk, and almost two pounds of sugar primarily consumed in the form of baked goods and pastries.

Dolly and Frank toured for over 20 years, wintering in a home they eventually established in Florida. The home became a haven for Dolly, away from the crowds and fitted out with suitably sized furniture and bathroom fixtures. During the winter months, she earned money by doing psychic readings from her home. Her weight eventually caused her to slow down and she began to suffer physically by her late 40s, making traveling with the circus more difficult.

Loses 440 pounds 
She regained her health and became an avid advocate of dieting and exercise.

Her autobiography, Diet or Die; The Dolly Dimples Weight Reducing Plan, was published in 1968 by F. Fell. Her weight loss was honored by the Guinness Book of World Records as the greatest amount lost in the shortest amount of time.

Geyer died in February 1982.

References

1901 births
1982 deaths
Sideshow performers
Diet food advocates
People from Cincinnati